This is a list of butterflies of Canada.

Family Hesperiidae – skippers

Subfamily Pyrginae – pyrgine skippers
Epargyreus clarus – silver-spotted skipper
Urbanus proteus – long-tailed skipper
Achalarus lyciades – hoary edge
Thorybes bathyllus – southern cloudywing
Thorybes pylades – northern cloudywing
Staphylus hayhurstii – Hayhurst's scallopwing
Erynnis icelus – dreamy duskywing
Erynnis brizo – sleepy duskywing
Erynnis juvenalis – Juvenal's duskywing
Erynnis propertius – propertius duskywing
Erynnis horatius – Horace's duskywing
Erynnis martialis – mottled duskywing
Erynnis pacuvius – Pacuvius duskywing
Erynnis zarucco – Zarucco duskywing
Erynnis funeralis – funereal duskywing
Erynnis lucilius – columbine duskywing
Erynnis baptisiae – wild indigo duskywing
Erynnis afranius – Afranius duskywing
Erynnis persius – Persius duskywing
Pyrgus centaureae – grizzled skipper
Pyrgus ruralis – two-banded checkered skipper
Pyrgus scriptura – small checkered skipper
Pyrgus communis – common checkered skipper
Pholisora catullus – common sootywing

Subfamily Heteropterinae – intermediate skippers
Carterocephalus palaemon – Arctic skipper

Subfamily Hesperiinae – branded skippers

Lerema accius – clouded skipper
Ancyloxypha numitor – least skipper
Oarisma poweshiek – Poweshiek skipperling
Oarisma garita – Garita skipperling
Thymelicus lineola – European skipper
Hylephila phyleus – fiery skipper
Hesperia uncas – uncas skipper
Hesperia juba – juba skipper
Hesperia comma – common branded skipper
Hesperia colorado – western branded skipper
Hesperia assiniboia – plains skipper
Hesperia ottoe – Ottoe skipper
Hesperia leonardus – Leonard's skipper
Hesperia pahaska – Pahaska skipper
Hesperia dacotae – Dakota skipper
Hesperia sassacus – Indian skipper
Hesperia nevada – Nevada skipper
Polites peckius – Peck's skipper
Polites sabuleti – sandhill skipper
Polites draco – draco skipper
Polites themistocles – tawny-edged skipper
Polites origenes – crossline skipper
Polites mystic – long dash skipper
Polites rhesus – rhesus skipper
Polites sonora – sonoran skipper
Polites vibex – whirlabout
Wallengrenia egeremet – northern broken-dash
Pompeius verna – little glassywing
Atalopedes campestris – sachem
Anatrytone logan – Delaware skipper
Ochlodes sylvanoides – woodland skipper
Poanes massasoit – mulberry wing
Poanes hobomok – Hobomok skipper
Poanes zabulon – Zabulon skipper
Poanes viator – broad-winged skipper
Euphyes dion – Dion skipper
Euphyes dukesi – Dukes' skipper
Euphyes conspicua – black dash
Euphyes bimacula – two-spotted skipper
Euphyes vestris – dun skipper
Atrytonopsis hianna – dusted skipper
Amblyscirtes simius – simius roadside skipper
Amblyscirtes oslari – Oslar's roadside skipper
Amblyscirtes hegon – pepper and salt skipper
Amblyscirtes vialis – common roadside skipper
Calpodes ethlius – Brazilian skipper
Panoquina ocola – ocola skipper

Family Papilionidae – parnassians and swallowtails

Subfamily Parnassiinae – parnassians
Parnassius eversmanni – Eversmann's parnassian
Parnassius clodius – Clodius parnassian
Parnassius phoebus – Phoebus parnassian
Parnassius smintheus – Rocky Mountain parnassian

Subfamily Papilioninae – swallowtails

Battus philenor – pipevine swallowtail
Eurytides marcellus – zebra swallowtail
Papilio polyxenes – black swallowtail
Papilio brevicauda – short-tailed swallowtail
Papilio machaon – Old World swallowtail
Papilio zelicaon – anise swallowtail
Papilio indra – Indra swallowtail
Papilio cresphontes – giant swallowtail
Papilio glaucus – eastern tiger swallowtail
Papilio canadensis – Canadian tiger swallowtail
Papilio rutulus – western tiger swallowtail
Papilio multicaudatus – two-tailed swallowtail
Papilio eurymedon – pale swallowtail
Papilio troilus – spicebush swallowtail

Family Pieridae – whites and sulphurs

Subfamily Pierinae – whites, marbles, and orangetips
Neophasia menapia – pine white
Pontia beckerii – Becker's white
Pontia sisymbrii – spring white
Pontia protodice – checkered white
Pontia occidentalis – western white
Pieris angelika – Arctic white
Pieris marginalis – margined white
Pieris oleracea – mustard white
Pieris virginiensis – West Virginia white
Pieris rapae – cabbage white
Ascia monuste – great southern white
Euchloe ausonides – large marble
Euchloe naina – green marble
Euchloe creusa – northern marble
Euchloe lotta – desert marble
Euchloe olympia – Olympia marble
Anthocharis sara – Pacific orangetip
Anthocharis stella – Stella orangetip

Subfamily Coliadinae – sulphurs

Colias philodice – clouded sulphur
Colias eurytheme – orange sulphur
Colias occidentalis – western sulphur
Colias alexandra – Queen Alexandra's sulphur
Colias christina – Christina sulphur
Colias meadii – Mead's sulphur
Colias johanseni – Johansen's sulphur
Colias hecla – hecla sulphur
Colias tyche – Booth's sulphur
Colias canadensis – Canada sulphur
Colias nastes – Labrador sulphur
Colias gigantea – giant sulphur
Colias pelidne – pelidne sulphur
Colias interior – pink-edged sulphur
Colias chippewa – heath sulphur
Colias palaeno – Palaeno sulphur
Zerene cesonia – southern dogface
Phoebis sennae – cloudless sulphur
Phoebis philea – orange-barred sulphur
Eurema mexicanum – Mexican yellow
Eurema lisa – little yellow
Eurema nicippe – sleepy orange
Nathalis iole – dainty sulphur

Family Lycaenidae – harvesters, coppers, hairstreaks, and blues

Subfamily Miletinae – harvesters
Feniseca tarquinius – harvester

Subfamily Lycaeninae – coppers

Lycaena phlaeas – American copper
Lycaena cuprea – lustrous copper
Lycaena dione – grey copper
Lycaena hyllus – bronze copper
Lycaena rubidus – ruddy copper
Lycaena heteronea – blue copper
Lycaena epixanthe – bog copper
Lycaena dorcas – dorcas copper
Lycaena dospassosi – Maritime copper
Lycaena helloides – purplish copper
Lycaena nivalis – lilac-bordered copper
Lycaena mariposa – mariposa copper

Subfamily Theclinae – hairstreaks

Satyrium behrii – Behr's hairstreak
Satyrium fuliginosum – sooty hairstreak
Satyrium acadicum – Acadian hairstreak
Satyrium californica – California hairstreak
Satyrium sylvinum – sylvan hairstreak
Satyrium titus – coral hairstreak
Satyrium edwardsii – Edwards' hairstreak
Satyrium calanus – banded hairstreak
Satyrium caryaevorum – hickory hairstreak
Satyrium liparops – striped hairstreak
Satyrium saepium – hedgerow hairstreak
Fixsenia favonius – southern hairstreak
Calycopis cecrops – red-banded hairstreak
Callophrys affinis – western green hairstreak
Callophrys sheridanii – Sheridan's hairstreak
Callophrys spinetorum – thicket hairstreak
Callophrys johnsoni – Johnson's hairstreak
Callophrys rosneri – Rosner's hairstreak
Callophrys barryi – Barry's hairstreak
Callophrys gryneus – juniper hairstreak
Callophrys augustinus – brown elfin
Callophrys mossii – Moss's elfin
Callophrys polios – hoary elfin
Callophrys irus – frosted elfin
Callophrys henrici – Henry's elfin
Callophrys lanoraieensis – bog elfin
Callophrys niphon – eastern pine elfin
Callophrys eryphon – western pine elfin
Parrhasius m-album – white hairstreak
Strymon melinus – grey hairstreak
Erora laeta – early hairstreak

Subfamily Polyommatinae – blues

Leptotes marina – marine blue
Echinargus isola – Reakirt's blue
Cupido comyntas – eastern tailed-blue
Cupido amyntula – western tailed-blue
Celastrina ladon – spring azure
Celastrina lucia – lucia azure
Celastrina neglecta – summer azure
Celastrina serotina – cherry gall azure
Euphilotes battoides – square-spotted blue
Euphilotes ancilla – Rocky Mountain dotted blue
Glaucopsyche piasus – arrowhead blue
Glaucopsyche lygdamus – silvery blue
Plebejus idas – northern blue
Plebejus melissa – Melissa blue
Icaricia icarioides – Boisduval's blue
Icaricia lupini – lupine blue
Icaricia saepiolus – greenish blue
Icaricia shasta – shasta blue
Agriades optilete – cranberry blue
Agriades glandon – Arctic blue

Family Riodinidae – metalmarks
Apodemia mormo – Mormon metalmark

Family Nymphalidae – brush-footed butterflies

Subfamily Libytheinae – snouts
Libytheana carinenta – American snout

Subfamily Heliconiinae – fritillaries
Agraulis vanillae – gulf fritillary
Euptoieta claudia – variegated fritillary
Euptoieta hegesia – Mexican fritillary
Speyeria cybele – great spangled fritillary
Speyeria aphrodite – Aphrodite fritillary
Speyeria idalia – regal fritillary
Speyeria edwardsii – Edwards' fritillary
Speyeria coronis – coronis fritillary
Speyeria zerene – zerene fritillary
Speyeria callippe – callippe fritillary
Speyeria atlantis – Atlantis fritillary
Speyeria hesperis – northwestern fritillary
Speyeria hydaspe – hydaspe fritillary
Speyeria mormonia – Mormon fritillary
Boloria napaea – mountain fritillary
Boloria eunomia – bog fritillary
Boloria selene – silver-bordered fritillary
Boloria bellona – meadow fritillary
Boloria frigga – Frigga fritillary
Boloria improba – dingy fritillary
Boloria epithore – Pacific fritillary
Boloria polaris – Polaris fritillary
Boloria freija – Freija fritillary
Boloria natazhati – Beringian fritillary
Boloria alberta – Alberta fritillary
Boloria astarte – Astarte fritillary
Boloria chariclea – Arctic fritillary

Subfamily Nymphalinae – anglewings, tortoiseshells, ladies, checkerspots and crescents
Polygonia interrogationis – question mark
Polygonia comma – eastern comma
Polygonia satyrus – satyr comma
Polygonia faunus – green comma
Polygonia gracilis – hoary comma
Polygonia oreas – oreas comma
Polygonia progne – grey comma
Nymphalis vaualbum – Compton tortoiseshell
Nymphalis californica – California tortoiseshell
Nymphalis antiopa – mourning cloak
Nymphalis milberti – Milbert's tortoiseshell
Vanessa virginiensis – American lady
Vanessa cardui – painted lady
Vanessa annabella – West Coast lady
Vanessa atalanta – red admiral
Junonia coenia – common buckeye
Chlosyne gorgone – gorgone checkerspot
Chlosyne nycteis – silvery checkerspot
Chlosyne harrisii – Harris's checkerspot
Chlosyne palla – northern checkerspot
Chlosyne acastus – sagebrush checkerspot
Chlosyne hoffmanni – Hoffmann's checkerspot
Phyciodes tharos – pearl crescent
Phyciodes cocyta – northern crescent
Phyciodes batesii – tawny crescent
Phyciodes pallida – pale crescent
Phyciodes pulchella – field crescent
Phyciodes mylitta – mylitta crescent
Euphydryas gillettii – Gillette's checkerspot
Euphydryas chalcedona – variable checkerspot
Euphydryas editha – Edith's checkerspot
Euphydryas phaeton – Baltimore checkerspot

Subfamily Limenitidinae – admirals
Limenitis arthemis – white admiral, red-spotted purple
Limenitis archippus – viceroy
Limenitis weidemeyerii – Weidemeyer's admiral
Limenitis lorquini – Lorquin's admiral

Subfamily Apaturinae – emperors
Asterocampa celtis – hackberry emperor
Asterocampa clyton – tawny emperor

Subfamily Satyrinae – satyrs and wood-nymphs

Enodia anthedon – northern pearly-eye
Satyrodes eurydice – eyed brown
Satyrodes appalachia – Appalachian brown
Megisto cymela – little wood-satyr
Coenonympha tullia – common ringlet
Coenonympha nipisiquit – maritime ringlet
Cercyonis pegala – common wood-nymph
Cercyonis sthenele – Great Basin wood-nymph
Cercyonis oetus – small wood-nymph
Erebia vidleri – Vidler's alpine
Erebia rossii – Ross's alpine
Erebia disa – Disa alpine
Erebia mancinus – taiga alpine
Erebia magdalena – Magdalena alpine
Erebia mackinleyensis – Mt. McKinley alpine
Erebia fasciata – banded alpine
Erebia discoidalis – red-disked alpine
Erebia pawlowskii – yellow-dotted alpine
Erebia youngi – four-dotted alpine
Erebia anyuica – scree alpine
Erebia lafontainei – reddish alpine
Erebia epipsodea – common alpine
Neominois ridingsii – Ridings' satyr
Oeneis nevadensis – great arctic
Oeneis macounii – Macoun's arctic or Canada arctic
Oeneis chryxus – chryxus arctic or brown arctic
Oeneis uhleri – Uhler's arctic
Oeneis alberta – Alberta arctic
Oeneis bore – white-veined arctic
Oeneis jutta – Jutta arctic
Oeneis melissa – Melissa arctic
Oeneis polixenes – Polixenes arctic
Oeneis rosovi – Philip's arctic
Oeneis alpina – sentinel arctic

Subfamily Danainae – milkweed butterflies
Danaus plexippus – monarch

See also
 List of butterflies of North America
 List of moths of Canada
 List of damselflies of Canada
 List of dragonflies of Canada

References
 Butterflies of Canada, Canadian Biodiversity Information Facility

Butterfies
Canada
Canada
Canada
Butterfies